National Secondary Route 241, or just Route 241 (or ) is a National Road Route of Costa Rica, located in the Limón province.

Description
In Limón province the route covers Limón canton (Limón, Matama districts).

Junction list
The entire route is in Limón canton, of Limón province.

References

Highways in Costa Rica